Mats Olsson may refer to:
 Mats Olsson (handballer) (born 1960), Swedish handball player
 Mats Olsson (musician) (1929–2013), Swedish musician